CBS 13 may refer to any of the following CBS affiliates:

Currently affiliated

Owned-and-operated stations
KOVR in Sacramento, California
WJZ-TV in Baltimore, Maryland

Affiliated stations
KLBK-TV in Lubbock, Texas
KOGG-DT3 in Wailuku, Hawaii
Re-broadcast of KGMB in Honolulu, Hawaii
KOLD-TV in Tucson, Arizona
KRCG in Columbia / Jefferson City, Missouri
KRQE in Albuquerque, New Mexico
KSIX-DT3 in Hilo, Hawaii
Re-broadcast of KGMB in Honolulu, Hawaii
KTNL-TV in Sitka, Alaska
KXDF-CD in Fairbanks, Alaska
KXMC-TV in Minot, North Dakota
Part of the KX Television Network
KVAL-TV in Eugene, Oregon
KYLX-LD in Laredo, Texas
KYMA-DT in Yuma, Arizona / El Centro, California
WBTW in Florence / Myrtle Beach; South Carolina
WGME-TV in Portland, Maine
WIBW-TV in Topeka, Kansas
WLOX-DT2 in Biloxi, Mississippi
WMAZ-TV in Macon, Georgia
WOWK-TV in Huntington / Charleston, West Virginia

Formerly affiliated
KHOL-TV (now KHGI-TV) in Kearney, Nebraska (1953 to 1961)
KVTV in Laredo, Texas (1973 to 2015)
WAFM-TV/WABT/WAPI-TV (now WVTM-TV in Birmingham, Alabama (primarily from 1949 to 1954 and secondarily from 1965 to 1970)
WHIO-TV, Dayton, Ohio (1949 to 1952, now on channel 7)
WAST/WNYT in Albany, New York (1954 to 1955 and 1977 to 1981)
WHBQ-TV in Memphis, Tennessee (1953 to 1956)
WREX in Rockford, Illinois (1953 to 1965)
WSET-TV in Lynchburg, Virginia (1953 to 1954)
WTVT in Tampa/St. Petersburg, Florida (1955 to 1994)